The 1908 Detroit Tigers season was a season in American baseball. The team won the American League championship by means of a scheduling quirk, finishing just one-half game ahead of the Cleveland Naps. The two teams won the same number of games, but the Tigers completed and lost one fewer. They then lost to the Chicago Cubs in the 1908 World Series.

Regular season
The early part of the season was defined in part by Ty Cobb's contract dispute with the team. He claimed that the owners have too much power. Eventually Cobb settled for a $4,800 contract. After opening day, the Tigers averaged only 4,400 fans per game.

Season standings

Record vs. opponents

Roster

Player stats

Batting

Starters by position
Note: Pos = Position; G = Games played; AB = At bats; H = Hits; Avg. = Batting average; HR = Home runs; RBI = Runs batted in

Other batters
Note: G = Games played; AB = At bats; H = Hits; Avg. = Batting average; HR = Home runs; RBI = Runs batted in

Pitching

Starting pitchers
Note: G = Games pitched; IP = Innings pitched; W = Wins; L = Losses; ERA = Earned run average; SO = Strikeouts

Other pitchers
Note: G = Games pitched; IP = Innings pitched; W = Wins; L = Losses; ERA = Earned run average; SO = Strikeouts

1908 World Series

Game 1 
October 10, 1908, at Bennett Park in Detroit, Michigan

Game 2 
October 11, 1908, at West Side Park in Chicago, Illinois

Game 3 
October 12, 1908, at West Side Park in Chicago, Illinois

Game 4 
October 13, 1908, at Bennett Park in Detroit, Michigan

Game 5 
October 14, 1908, at Bennett Park in Detroit, Michigan

Notes

References 

1908 Detroit Tigers season at Baseball Reference

Detroit Tigers seasons
Detroit Tigers season
American League champion seasons
Detroit Tigers
1908 in Detroit